HD 140913 is a star very much like our own Sun located in the northern constellation of Corona Borealis (The Northern Crown). It is too faint to be visible to the naked eye with an apparent visual magnitude of 8.07. The star is located at a distance of 158 light years from the Sun based on parallax. Prior to the discovery of a companion, this served as an IAU radial velocity standard, and it is receding from the Sun at a rate of +37 km/s. The space velocity components of this star are  = .

This is a solar-type star with a stellar classification of G0V. It is an estimated seven billion years old and is spinning with a projected rotational velocity of 9.7 km/s. The star is about the same size as the Sun with 92% of the Sun's mass. It is radiating 1.2 times the Sun's luminosity from its photosphere at an effective temperature of 5,957 K.

The detection of an orbiting companion, designated HD 140913 B, was announced in 1994. The minimum mass of this object is 43.2 times the mass of Jupiter, making it a brown dwarf candidate. Alternatively, it may be an under-mass helium white dwarf that has lost its envelope during a mass transfer. It orbits the host star about every 148 days with an eccentricity (ovalness) of ~0.57 and a semimajor axis of at least .

References

G-type main-sequence stars
Brown dwarfs
Corona Borealis
BD+28 2469
140913
077152